Mongyang or Möngyang (also known as Mong Yang) was a Shan state in what is today Burma. It was an outlying territory, located away from the main Shan State area in present-day Kachin State. The state existed before 1400 and after 1604. The main town was Mohnyin (Mong Yang).

History 
Möngyang (Mong Yang) was a Shan state established at an uncertain date before the 15th century with the town of Mohnyin as its capital. In 1527 Mongyang armies succeeded in capturing Ava, upsetting the delicate power balance that had existed in the area for nearly two centuries.

A record of the conquest of Mongyang in 1557 is mentioned in a bell inscription relating the conquests of King Bayinnaung.
Occupied by the Taungoo dynasty of Burma between 1579 and 1584, the state was extinguished in 1604.

Rulers

Möngyang (Mohnyin)
State existed before 1400 and after 1604 .

Saophas:
 60?–6?? Hkun Hpa (2nd son of Hkun Lu)
 940–964 Sao Kyan Hpa 
 1390–1410 Hso Kyaung Hpa 
 1410–1430 Hso Ngaan Hpa 
 1430–1451 Hso Taan Hpa 
 1451–1486 Hso Bok Hpa 
 2 April 1486 – 1533 Hso Kyen Hpa 
 1533–1567 Sao Möng Hkam 
 1567–1603 Sao Pha Hkam 
 1603–1629 Hso Htin Hpa  
 1629–1652 Hso Ngaan Hpa 
 1652–1674 Hso Ngam Möng 
 1674–1697 Hso Hkan Hpa 
 1697–1713 Hso Oum Hpa 
 1713–1733 Hso Hkam Hpa 
 1733–1753 Hso Ka Hpa 
 1753–1773 Hso Han Hpa 
 1773–1793 Sao Kyam Hkam 
 1793–1805 Sao Pan Hkam 
 1805–1816 Hkam Hlaing Hpa  
 1816–1833 Sao Haw Lik 
 1833–1845 Sao Pan Serk 
 1845–1876 Sao Hsan Hpa 
 1876–1924 Sao Hla Hkam (last saopha)

Myowuns
Under the Konbaung dynasty the area of the former state was administered by a Viceroy called a Myowun, who was appointed by the king and possessed civil, judicial, fiscal and military powers.
 1853–18?? Nemyo Minhtin Themanta Yaza (Six Myowuns – Mohnyin, Kawng Ton, Shwegu, Moe Ta, Yin khia, Kat )

Popular culture
Mong Yang is a playable nation in Europa Universalis IV.

References

External links
"Gazetteer of Upper Burma and the Shan states"

Shan States
Kachin State